Anthony Thomas may refer to:

 Anthony Thomas (American football) (born 1977), American football player
 Anthony Thomas (English footballer) (born 1982), English footballer with Hemel Hempstead Town, Barnet and Cambridge City
 Anthony William Thomas (born 1949), Australian professor of physics at the University of Adelaide
 Anthony Richard Thomas, former British Ambassador to Angola and High Commissioner to Jamaica

See also
 
 Antony Thomas (born 1940), English filmmaker
 Tony Thomas (disambiguation)
 Antonio Thomas (disambiguation)